Argo Bromo Anggrek is the name of executive and luxury train jointly operated by Kereta Api Indonesia between Surabaya and Jakarta in Indonesia. It is one of the best known trains in Indonesia.

Etymology
The name Argo Bromo was derived from the volcano Bromo in East Java. The term anggrek was added to differentiate the train from its predecessor. The orchid is represented in the purple-white livery of the train.

Service
Its predecessor, the JS950 Argobromo, made the Jakarta–Surabaya run in about nine hours and was inaugurated on 31 July 1995 by the President of Indonesia, Suharto, ahead of the 50th anniversary of Indonesian Independence in 17 August (hence the JS950, for "Jakarta–Surabaya in nine hours, launched to commemorate the 50th anniversary of Indonesia's independence"). The success of the service led to the introduction of Argo Bromo Anggrek service which commenced on 24 September 1997. 

The difference between Argo Bromo Anggrek and the original JS950 Argobromo train service is the usage of a set of more sophisticated passenger coach with bolsterless bogies, which are made locally by Indonesian Railway Industry (INKA). Although initially hailed as technological innovation of its day, even nicknamed as "747 on rail" by Tourism Minister Joop Ave, they were later downgraded in later years by having the disc brakes replaced with conventional brake shoes, and automatic doors replaced by manual ones due to poor maintenance, especially during and after the 1997 Asian Financial Crisis and a derailment at Manggarai station in 2010.

From Pasar Turi, this train departs at 09.00 and 20.35, arrives at Gambir at 17.44 and 05.19.

Argo Bromo Anggrek trains are composed of eight executive class, and one Luxury class passenger coaches, pulled by GE CM20EMP (previously GE U20C) locomotives. At the time of its first inauguration, the train used a set of special coaches with "K9" bolsterless bogies. Since December 2010, coaches from the Sembrani and other standard executive class trains (K1) substitute the K9 coaches, which in that stage underwent refurbishment and renovation at INKA, Madiun, East Java. Since 2019, Argo Bromo Anggrek uses stainless-steel coaches produced by INKA which has a standardized design as other executive class coaches built in the same period in Indonesia.

Facilities

Argo Bromo Anggrek provides entertainment facilities during the journey in the form of audio-video (Show On Rail). Passengers can also order food and drinks, which can be consumed in either the passenger's coaches or in a dedicated restaurant coach equipped with karaoke facilities. All of this is deliberately designed to give the atmosphere of a hotel.

Timetable 
Argo Bromo Anggrek schedule as of 10 February 2021:

Incidents
2005: a dining car caught fire.
2009: a power car caught fire at Cikampek. The train continued on to  without the power car.
2 October 2010: at 3:00 am the Argo Bromo Anggrek collided with the Fajar Utama Semarang at Petarukan station. Thirty-three people were killed and 26 injured, and coaches six and nine destroyed.
16 December 2010: four students were hit in Dengok, Padangan, Bojonegoro, East Java. Three were killed.
16 November 2012: the train derailed near Bulakamba station.
9 March 2015: the train, pulled by locomotive 13 68, collided with a truck in Weleri, Kendal, Central Java. The driver died after the accident.

See also 
 Jakarta–Surabaya line
 List of named passenger trains of Indonesia
 Rail transport in Indonesia
Argo Wilis same destination train but different start

References

External links 

 

Passenger rail transport in Indonesia
Railway services introduced in 1997
1997 establishments in Indonesia